Koningin Emmaschool, meaning Queen Emma School in Dutch, may refer to:

 Koningin Emmaschool (Surabaya), a technical school in the Dutch East Indies which operated from 1912 to 1941
 Koningin Emmaschool (Oud-Zuilen), a national monument and former school in Oud-Zuilen, Netherlands
 Koningin Emmaschool, a school in Haarlem built in 1938-9